Leptotes babaulti, the Babault's zebra blue, is a butterfly of the family Lycaenidae. It is found in the Afrotropical realm. The habitat consists of savanna bushveld at 1,000 m and riverine bush to montane grassland at 1,900 m.

The wingspan is 22–29 mm for males and 26–30 mm for females. Adults are on wing year-round, with a peak from November to April.

References

Leptotes (butterfly)
Butterflies described in 1935